Değirmenbaşı can refer to:

 Değirmenbaşı, Düzce
 Değirmenbaşı, İvrindi